Isaac Haxton (born September 6, 1985) is an American professional poker player known for his accomplishments in high-roller poker tournaments and high-stakes online cash games.

Early life

Haxton was born in suburban New York City and raised in Westchester. His mother is a psychiatrist and his father is an English professor who introduced Isaac to games of skill at an early age. He played chess at the age of four and Magic: The Gathering by the age of ten.

After high school Haxton attended Brown University as a computer science major, but later spent more time playing poker than studying.

Poker career

After turning 18, Haxton transitioned from competitive Magic: The Gathering to playing poker at the Turning Stone Casino in Verona, New York starting at $3/$6 limit before slowly moving up in stakes. He transitioned to online poker with a $50 deposit on Ultimate Bet.

In 2007, he cashed in his first tournament at the WPT Championship Event finishing runner-up to Ryan Daut for $861,789.

In September 2018, Haxton won Event #4: $10,000 Short Deck at the 2018 Poker Masters for $176,000.

In December 2018, Haxton won Super High Roller Bowl V for $3,672,000.

In January 2023, Haxton won the 2023 PokerGO Cup $50,000 No-Limit Hold'em finale for $598,000. The next week, Haxton won the 2023 PokerStars Caribbean Adventure $100,000 PCA Super High Roller for $1,082,230.

As of January 2023, Haxton has cashed for more than $31,500,000 in live poker tournaments.

Online poker

Haxton is considered one of the top online cash game specialists and plays under the aliases, Ike Haxton, luvtheWNBA, and philivey2694 where he has earned over $2,000,000. Although successful in tournament play, he prefers online cash games and considers them to be his specialty.

Personal life

Haxton is married to his wife Zoe. His father wrote his biography, Fading Hearts on the River: My Son’s Life in Poker.

References

External links
 Isaac Haxton Hendon Mob profile

American poker players
Living people
1985 births
Brown University alumni